The Church of Saint John the Baptist, popularly known also as Iglesia de Pocitos (due to its location in the neighbourhood of Pocitos) is a Roman Catholic parish church in Montevideo, Uruguay.

History
Originally there was a small chapel near the beach. In 1890 is purchased the plot where a better temple was to be built. Finally, on 25 June 1899 is laid the fundamental stone of the present temple, which is dedicated to saint John the Baptist. The construction took decades; the decisive boost was given by the priest Domingo Tamburini, appointed parish priest in 1925. 

This church is an important landmark in its neighbourhood and a very popular wedding venue. The Montevideo Philharmonic Orchestra holds concerts here during its seasons.

Same devotion
There are other churches in Uruguay dedicated to St. John the Baptist:
 Cathedral Basilica of St. John the Baptist in Salto
 St. John the Baptist Parish Church in Santa Lucía
 St. John the Baptist Parish Church in San Bautista
 St. John the Baptist Parish Church in Río Branco
 St. John the Baptist Parish Church in Mercedes
 St. John the Baptist Chapel in Ismael Cortinas

References

External links

 Parish of St. John the Baptist

Pocitos, Montevideo

Roman Catholic church buildings in Montevideo
Romanesque Revival church buildings in Uruguay